Pouilly-sur-Meuse (literally Pouilly on Meuse) is a commune in the Meuse department in Grand Est in north-eastern France.

See also
 Communes of the Meuse department

References

Pouillysurmeuse